Stuart Martin (born 8 January 1986) is a Scottish actor. He is known for his roles in the Channel 4 comedy-drama Babylon (2014),  as well as the historical dramas Medici: Masters of Florence (2016), Jamestown (2017–2019), and Miss Scarlet and The Duke (2020–present).

He studied drama at the Royal Conservatoire of Scotland.

Personal life
His wife Lisa McGrillis is also an actress; they met at a Christmas party in the National Theatre bar. They have two children.

Filmography

Film

Television

References

External links

21st-century Scottish male actors
Living people
Scottish male television actors
1986 births
People from Ayr
Scottish male film actors
Alumni of the Royal Conservatoire of Scotland